Françoise Aubut-Pratte, née Aubut (5 September 1922 – 8 October 1984) was a Canadian concert organist, and music teacher.

Life 
Born in Saint-Jérôme (Quebec), a great-granddaughter of Calixa Lavallée, she began her piano studies at the age of six. At the Conservatoire national de musique of Montreal, she studied organ with Eugène Lapierre, harmony and piano with Antonio Létourneau.

She continued her studies at the New England Conservatory of Boston under the direction of Carl McKinley (organ), Jesús María Sanroma (piano) and Marian Mason (harmony), and won a "Soloist Diploma" in 1938.

In the fall of 1938, she moved to Paris where she worked at the Conservatoire de Paris with Olivier Messiaen (musical analysis), Marcel Dupré (organ and improvisation), Simone Plé-Caussade (counterpoint and fugue), Norbert Dufourcq (music history), and Henri Büsser (musical composition). At the École normale de musique de Paris, she worked on musical writing with Nadia Boulanger and piano with Alfred Cortot.

Despite the deprivations of the war, the German occupation and an eight-month internment in Besançon, she won an exceptional Grand Premier Prix at the age of 21, crowning all the courses followed at the Paris Conservatory in 1944. This was the first time that a North American citizen had received this honour.

She taught organ and fugue at the Faculty of Music of the Université de Montréal from 1951 and gave organ lessons at the École de musique Vincent-d'Indy from 1967. Among her students were Françoys Bernier, Victor Bouchard, Marthe Lesage, Denis Regnaud, Jeannine Vanier, and Christopher Jackson.

She was a member of the jury for the 1956 Prix d'Europe competition and the 1962 and 1978 Conservatoire de Paris exams.

Françoise Aubut died in Montreal at age 62. She was entombed at the Notre Dame des Neiges Cemetery in Montreal.

Recordings 
 3rd Choral by Franck, Pange lingua, Ave Maris Stella and Symphonie-Passion by Dupré, (RCI 122), 1956.
 Psaume CL by Jean Papineau-Couture avec la Chorale Bach de Montréal. (RCI 128 et 6-ACM 4) 1956.

References

External links 
 
 Musica et Memoria Detailed Biography by Michelle Quintal, photos and documents.
 Société Saint-Jean-Baptiste Prix Calixa-Lavallée.
 L'orgue au Québec Orgue Casavant (1960) de la chapelle conventuelle Saint-Albert-le-Grand, Montréal.
 Fonds Françoise Aubut-Pratte fonds d'archives conservé par la Division de la gestion de documents et des archives de l'Université de Montréal.

1922 births
1984 deaths
People from Saint-Jérôme
Canadian classical organists
Women organists
Canadian music educators
Conservatoire de Paris alumni
École Normale de Musique de Paris alumni
20th-century Canadian women musicians
Musicians from Quebec
Women music educators
Burials at Notre Dame des Neiges Cemetery
Canadian people imprisoned abroad
20th-century classical musicians
Canadian expatriates in the United States
Canadian expatriates in France